The Umgeni River or Mgeni River is a river in KwaZulu-Natal, South Africa. It rises in the "Dargle" in the KZN Midlands, and its mouth is at Durban, some distance north of Durban's natural harbour. The name is taken to mean "the river of entrance" in Zulu, though other meanings have been proposed.

The Howick Falls are some famous waterfalls on the Mngeni.

Tributaries
A noteworthy tributary is the Msunduzi River, which joins it between Nagle and Inanda dams. Higher up its course, the Msunduzi (or 'Dusi' for short) passes through the KwaZulu-Natal capital Pietermaritzburg. A famous downriver race, the Dusi Canoe Marathon takes place between the capital and Durban, attracting thousands of canoeists for the three-day event held in January every year.

A small tributary that has an impact exceeding its size and length is the Lions River which joins the Umgeni about 4 kilometers upstream of Midmar Dam (near Lidgetton).  Its significance lies in the fact that it is a part of a water transfer scheme between the Mooi River (Spring Grove Dam) and the Umgeni.

A smaller tributary close to its mouth is the  Palmiet River, which should not be confused with the Palmiet River in the Western Cape.

Dams
Presently the Umgeni is part of the Mvoti to Umzimkulu Water Management Area. There are four large dams in its catchment basin: 
 Albert Falls Dam
 Inanda Dam
 Midmar Dam
 Nagle Dam

Ecology
The Scaly Yellowfish (Labeobarbus natalensis) is a fish found in the Umgeni River System as well as in the Umzimkhulu, Thukela, Umkhomazi and the Umfolozi. It is a common endemic species in KwaZulu-Natal Province and it lives in different habitats between the Drakensberg foothills and the coastal lowlands.

History
It is assumed that Vasco da Gama replenished his fleet's water supply at the Umgeni mouth on Christmas Day, 1497, and so named the region Natal, Portuguese for Christmas. The river then acquired the name "River of Natal".

130 years later the Umgeni was crossed by Nathaniel Isaacs on his way to visit Shaka.

See also
Umgeni River Bird Park
 List of rivers of South Africa
 List of reservoirs and dams in South Africa

References

External links

Rivers of KwaZulu-Natal